YPF Tower is a corporate high-rise building designed by internationally recognized architect César Pelli and is the headquarters of Argentine national oil company YPF. Construction began in 2005, in the Puerto Madero barrio (district) of Buenos Aires, Argentina and the office building was completed in September 2008. It was, upon completion in 2008, the tallest office building in Argentina, and the third tallest overall. The building is located on the corner of Macacha Güemes and Juana Manso streets, in the Puerto Madero ward.

The building's construction cost an estimated US$134 million. The main contractor in its construction was CRIBA, a leading local contractor founded in 1952 by Alberto Tarasido.

On May 25, 2012, 21 days after the nationalization of YPF by the government of Cristina Fernandez de Kirchner, the YPF Tower was lit in the colors of the Argentinean flag as a political statement to commemorate 202 years of self-governance.

As of 2021, following years of hardship, YPF was seeking US$400 million for its sale.

References

Buildings and structures in Buenos Aires
Office buildings completed in 2008
Skyscraper office buildings in Argentina
YPF
t
César Pelli buildings
2008 establishments in Argentina